SM U-121 was a Type UE II long-range minelaying U-boat of the Imperial German Navy intended for service in the Mediterranean. The Austro-Hungarian Navy allocated her the number SM U-84. She was built at Hamburg, Germany, by Aktiengesellschaft Vulcan and launched on 20 September 1918. Incomplete at the Armistice she was never commissioned in the Imperial German Navy but surrendered to the Allies at Harwich on 9 March 1919. Handed over to France, she was sunk as a gunnery target off Cherbourg on 1 July 1921.

References

Notes

Citations

Bibliography

German Type UE II submarines
Ships built in Hamburg
1918 ships
World War I submarines of Germany
U-boats sunk in 1921
Maritime incidents in 1921
Ships sunk as targets
Shipwrecks of France
Shipwrecks in the English Channel